is a district located in Fukuoka Prefecture, Japan.

As of 2003, the district has an estimated population of 58,747 and a density of 297.09 persons per km2. The total area is 197.74 km2.

Towns and villages
Kanda
Miyako

Mergers
 On March 20, 2006 the towns of Katsuyama, Saigawa and Toyotsu all merged to form the new town of Miyako.

Districts in Fukuoka Prefecture